Liometopum sinense is a species of ant in the genus Liometopum. Described by William Morton Wheeler in 1921, the species is endemic to China.

References

Dolichoderinae
Insects described in 1921
Hymenoptera of Europe
Hymenoptera of Asia